Suzanne Pleshette (January 31, 1937 – January 19, 2008) was an American theatre, film, television, and voice actress. Pleshette started her career in the theatre and began appearing in films in the late 1950s and later appeared in prominent films such as Rome Adventure (1962), Alfred Hitchcock's The Birds (1963), and Spirited Away (2001). She later appeared in various television productions, often in guest roles, and played Emily Hartley on The Bob Newhart Show from 1972 until 1978, receiving several Emmy Award nominations for her work.

Early life
Pleshette was born on January 31, 1937, in the New York City neighborhood of Brooklyn Heights, to Geraldine (née Kaplan) and Eugene Pleshette. Her parents were Jewish, the children of emigrants from Russia and Austria-Hungary. Her mother was a dancer and artist who performed under the stage name Geraldine Rivers. Her father was a stage manager of the Paramount Theater in Manhattan and of the Paramount Theater in Brooklyn, and later, a network executive. She graduated from Manhattan's High School of Performing Arts and attended Syracuse University for one semester, then transferred to Finch College. She later graduated from Manhattan's prestigious acting school, the Neighborhood Playhouse School of the Theatre and was under the tutelage of renowned acting teacher Sanford Meisner.

Acting career

Stage

The Boston Globe described her appearance and demeanor as sardonic and her voice as sultry. She began her career at age 20 as a stage actress. She made her Broadway debut in Meyer Levin's 1957 play Compulsion, adapted from his novel inspired by the Leopold and Loeb case.

The following year, she performed in the debut of The Cold Wind and the Warm by S. N. Behrman at the Shubert Theatre in New Haven, Connecticut, directed by Harold Clurman and produced by Robert Whitehead. In 1959, she was featured in the comedy Golden Fleecing, starring Constance Ford and Tom Poston. (Poston would eventually become her third husband.)

That same year, she was one of two finalists for the role of Louise/Gypsy in the original production of Gypsy. During the run of The Cold Wind and the Warm, she spent mornings taking striptease lessons from Jerome Robbins for the role in Gypsy. In his autobiography, Arthur Laurents, the play's author stated, "It came down to between Suzanne Pleshette and Sandra Church. Suzanne was the better actress, but Sandra was the better singer. We went with Sandra."

In February 1961, she succeeded Anne Bancroft as Anne Sullivan Macy opposite 14-year-old Patty Duke's Helen Keller in The Miracle Worker.

Film
Her early screen credits include The Geisha Boy, Rome Adventure, Fate Is the Hunter, and Youngblood Hawke, but she was best known at that time for her role in Alfred Hitchcock's suspense film The Birds. Immediately following The Birds, Pleshette was cast in 40 Pounds of Trouble, a comedy film co-starring Tony Curtis and Phil Silvers, which Curtis was producing through his own film production company, Curtis Enterprises. 40 Pounds of Trouble was the first motion picture ever filmed at Disneyland, and was distributed by Universal-International Pictures in late 1962.

She worked with Steve McQueen in the 1966 western drama film Nevada Smith, was nominated for a Laurel Award for her starring performance in the comedy If It's Tuesday, This Must Be Belgium opposite Ian McShane, and co-starred with James Garner in a pair of films, the drama Mister Buddwing and the western comedy Support Your Local Gunfighter. She starred in a number of Walt Disney family films, most notably in The Shaggy D.A. (1976). She was the lead actress in Hot Stuff (1979) and Oh, God! Book II (1980).

Pleshette provided the voices of Yubaba and Zeniba in the English dub of Japanese director Hayao Miyazaki's Academy Award-winning film Spirited Away and the voice of Zira in Disney's direct-to-video film The Lion King II: Simba's Pride and sang the song "My Lullaby".

Television

Pleshette's first screen role was in the episode "Night Rescue" (December 5, 1957) of the CBS adventure/drama television series Harbormaster, starring Barry Sullivan and Paul Burke. Other early television appearances include Playhouse 90, Decoy, Have Gun – Will Travel, One Step Beyond, Riverboat, Alfred Hitchcock Presents, The Tab Hunter Show, Channing, Ben Casey, Naked City, 'Gunsmoke, Wagon Train, the pilot episode of The Wild Wild West, and Dr. Kildare, for which she was nominated for her first Emmy Award. She guest-starred more than once as different characters in each of the following 1960s TV series: Route 66,  The Fugitive, The Invaders, The F.B.I., Columbo (1971) and The Name of the Game.

On May 19, 1971, TV producers saw her on The Tonight Show Starring Johnny Carson and noticed a certain chemistry between Suzanne and Johnny.  She was cast as the wife of Newhart's character on the popular CBS sitcom The Bob Newhart Show (1972–1978) for all six seasons, as part of CBS television's Saturday night lineup. She was nominated twice for the Emmy for Outstanding Lead Actress in a Comedy Series. She reprised her role of Emily Hartley in the final episode of Newhart's subsequent comedy series, Newhart, in which viewers discovered that the entire later series had been her husband Bob's dream when he awakens next to her in the bedroom set from the earlier series.

Her 1984 situation comedy, Suzanne Pleshette Is Maggie Briggs, was canceled after seven episodes. In 1989, she played the role of Christine Broderick in the NBC drama, Nightingales, which lasted one season.  In 1990, Pleshette portrayed Manhattan hotelier Leona Helmsley in the television movie Leona Helmsley: The Queen of Mean, which garnered her Emmy and Golden Globe Award nominations. In addition, she starred opposite Hal Linden in the 1994 sitcom The Boys Are Back.

She had a starring role in Good Morning, Miami, as Mark Feuerstein's grandmother Claire Arnold in season one and played the mother of Katey Sagal's character in the ABC sitcom 8 Simple Rules for Dating My Teenage Daughter following John Ritter's death, and appeared as the estranged mother of Megan Mullally's character Karen Walker in three episodes of Will & Grace. The role would prove to be her last.

Avocation
From 1969 to 1980, Pleshette designed sheets for J.P. Stevens & Co. She also wrote screenplays under a pen name.

Personal life
Pleshette's 1964 marriage to her Rome Adventure and A Distant Trumpet co-star Troy Donahue ended in divorce after six months.

Her second husband was oilman Tom Gallagher, to whom she was married from 1968 until his death from lung cancer on January 21, 2000. She suffered a miscarriage during her marriage to Gallagher, and they were childless. Asked about children in an October 2000 interview, Pleshette stated: "I certainly would have liked to have had Tommy’s children. But my nurturing instincts are fulfilled in other ways. I have a large extended family; I'm the mother on every set. So if this is my particular karma, that's fine."

In 2001, Pleshette married fellow actor Tom Poston. Poston had been a recurring guest star on The Bob Newhart Show in the 1970s and a Newhart cast member. But long before they worked together on television, Poston and Pleshette had been involved romantically in 1959, when they acted together in the Broadway comedy Golden Fleecing. During the subsequent 40 years, they married others but remained friends. After they were both widowed, the deaths of their spouses brought Poston and Pleshette together again, and they married in 2001. They remained married until his death from respiratory failure in Los Angeles on April 30, 2007.  She died the following year, and they are buried close to each other.

Suzanne Pleshette was the cousin of the actor John Pleshette.

Illness and death

On August 11, 2006, Pleshette's agent Joel Dean announced that she was being treated for lung cancer at Cedars-Sinai Medical Center. Three days later, The Herald-Palladium reported that Dean claimed the cancer was the size of "a grain of sand" when it was found during a routine X-ray, that the cancer was "caught very much in time," that she was receiving chemotherapy as an outpatient and that Pleshette was "in good spirits."

She was later hospitalized for a pulmonary infection and developed pneumonia which caused her to remain in the hospital for an extended period of time. She arrived at a Bob Newhart Show cast reunion in September 2007 in a wheelchair, which raised concern about her health although she insisted that she was "cancer-free." (She was seated in a regular chair during the actual telecast.) During an interview in USA Today given at the time of the reunion, Pleshette stated that she had been released four days earlier from the hospital where, as part of her cancer treatment, part of one of her lungs had been removed.

Pleshette died in the early evening of January 19, 2008, 12 days shy of her 71st birthday, in her Los Angeles home. She is buried close to her third husband, Tom Poston (who died the previous year), in the Hillside Memorial Park Cemetery in Culver City, California. She received a star on the Hollywood Walk of Fame for Television on January 31, 2008, the walk's 2,355th star, which was placed (at her request) in front of Frederick's of Hollywood. Bob Newhart, Arte Johnson, and Marcia Wallace spoke at the star's unveiling which had been planned before Pleshette's death. Tina Sinatra accepted the star on Pleshette's behalf.

Filmography

Feature films

Television films

Television series

 Decoy as Wendy Jenkins in " The Sound of Tears" (1958) – Wendy Jenkins
 Have Gun-Will Travel, "Death of a Gun Fighter" (1959) – Maria
 Adventures in Paradise "The Lady from South Chicago" (1959) – Minette
 One Step Beyond, "Delusion" (1959) – Martha Wizinski
 Alfred Hitchcock Presents, "Hitch Hike" (1960) – Anne
 Riverboat in "The Two Faces of Grey Holden" (1960) – Marie Tourette
 Naked City in "The Pedigree Sheet" (1960) – Nora Condon
 The Islanders as Iris in "Forbidden Cargo" (1960) – Iris
 Route 66 in "The Strengthening Angels" (1960) – Lottie Montana 
 Route 66 in "Blue Murder" (1961) – Blossom Bludge
 Hong Kong in "Lesson in Fear" (1961) – Diane Dooley 
 Target: The Corruptors (1962) – Hank 
 Dr. Kildare in "A Shining Image" (1961) – Julie Lawler,"The Soul Killer" (1962)-Nurse Cathy Benjamin,"Goodbye, Mr. Jersey" (1964)-Ellen Tracey Adams
 Wagon Train "The Myra Marshall Story" (1963) Myra Marshall
 The Fugitive "World's End" (1964), "All the Scared Rabbits" (1965) – Ellie Burnett / Peggy Franklyn
 The Wild Wild West, "Night of the Inferno" (1965) – Lydia Monteran
 The Invaders, "The Mutation" (1967), "The Pursued" (1968) -Vikki / Anne Gibbs
 It Takes a Thief, "A Sour Note" (1968) – Angela
 Gunsmoke, "Stark" (1970) – Glory Bramley
 Marcus Welby, M.D., "Daisy in the Shadows" (1970) – Ann Logan
 The Courtship of Eddie's Father, "Hello, Miss Bessinger, Goodbye" (1970) – Valerie Bessinger
 Columbo "Dead Weight" (1971) – Helen Stewart
 Ironside, "S05E15 – But When She Was Bad" (1971) – Shelly Kingman
 Bonanza "Season 13 Episode 24 – A Place to Hide" (1972) – Rose Becket / Katie Summers / Mrs. Ransom
 The Bob Newhart Show (1972–1978) – Emily Hartley
 Maggie Briggs (1984) – Maggie Briggs
 Kojak, "The Belarus File" (1985) – Dana Sutton
 Bridges to Cross (1985) – Tracy Bridges
 Nightingales (1989) – Christine Broderick
 Newhart, "The Last Newhart" (1990) – Emily Hartley
 The Boys Are Back (1994–1995) – Jackie Hansen
 Good Morning, Miami (2002–2003) – Claire Arnold
 8 Simple Rules for Dating My Teenage Daughter (2003) – Laura
 Will and Grace'' (2002–2004) – Lois Whitley (final television appearance)

References

External links

 
 
 
 
 
 
 
 
 Obituary in The Times, 22 January 2008 
 BroadwayWorld Article: Suzanne Pleshette Dies at 70

1937 births
2008 deaths
Actresses from New York City
American film actresses
American people of Austrian-Jewish descent
American people of Russian-Jewish descent
American stage actresses
American television actresses
American voice actresses
Jewish American actresses
Burials at Hillside Memorial Park Cemetery
Deaths from lung cancer in California
Deaths from respiratory failure
Deaths from pneumonia in California
20th-century American actresses
21st-century American actresses
Fiorello H. LaGuardia High School alumni
Finch College alumni
People from Brooklyn Heights
20th-century American Jews
21st-century American Jews